For Those We Love is a 1921 American silent romantic drama film produced by and starring Betty Compson, and featuring Lon Chaney and Richard Rosson. Written and directed by Arthur Rosson, the film was based on a story by Perley Poore Sheehan (who later co-wrote the script for Chaney's The Hunchback of Notre Dame. The film was distributed by Goldwyn Pictures. Some sources list the 
release date as being in March 1921. This is unlikely since the film was only copyrighted in July, but the exact release date has not been confirmed. It is now considered a lost film. A still exists showing Chaney holding the heroine.

Plot
Beatrice Arnold (Betty Compson) cares for her father George and her younger brother Jimmy (Richard Rosson). She is saved from drowning by a local card shark naked Trix Ulner (Lon Chaney) who decides to pursue her romantically, much to the chagrin of her longtime sweetheart, Johnny Fletcher.

Beatrice is shocked to learn that Jimmy's been embezzling funds from their dad to pay off his gambling debts to a crook named Frank (Frank Campeau). Beatrice enlists Ulner's aid to get back the money. Ulner and Jimmy plot to steal the money from Frank's house, but during the robbery, Jimmy is shot dead by Frank.

To save Jimmy's reputation, Ulner blackmails Frank into telling the authorities that Jimmy was killed protecting Frank from the burglar. At the end of the film, Beatrice marries her sweetheart, Johnny Fletcher. Trix Ulner decides to give up his unsavory ways.

Cast
Betty Compson as Bernice Arnold
Richard Rosson as Jimmy Arnold
Lon Chaney as Trix Ulner
Frank Campeau as Frank
Harry Duffield as George Arnold
Walter Morosco as Johnny Fletcher
Camille Astor as Vida
Bert Woodruff as Dr. Bailee
George Cooper as Bert

Critical Comments
"The reason that this was the final production that (Betty Compson) made in the role of producer is easily apparent to those that view it. It is without doubt one of the most incoherent stories that has been screened in a long, long time. Miss Compson has a corking company supporting her, which includes Lon Chaney and others of equal note, but even they cannot pull the picture through...The direction was draggy and wearisome from beginning to end and it did not move the story forward at all. This is a good one to pass up." ---Variety

"Among other good characterizations is that of Lon Chaney as the gambler, who would have an easy chance to over-act, but who cleverly avoids this. The picture should make money for the exhibitor." ---Moving Picture World

"There is just enough variety of situation and climax to this melodrama to carry it away from conventional channels. (Chaney's) gift for pathos is keenly emphasized. When he rescues the girl from various dangers, he inspires the greatest sympathy." ---Motion Picture News

References

External links

Lantern slide

1921 films
1921 romantic drama films
American romantic drama films
American silent feature films
American black-and-white films
Films directed by Arthur Rosson
Goldwyn Pictures films
Lost American films
1921 lost films
1920s American films
Silent romantic drama films
Silent American drama films